Eva Paalma (born 21 December 1994) is a retired Estonian tennis player.

Paalma, who was born in Tallinn, won two doubles titles on the ITF Circuit in her career. On 20 October 2014, she reached her best doubles ranking of world No. 691.

Playing for the Estonia Fed Cup team, Paalma has a win–loss record of 5–5. According to the reports, Eva Paalma was a representative on the Student-Athlete Advisory Committee.

ITF finals

Doubles (2–2)

Fed Cup participation

Singles (1–2)

Doubles (4–3)

References

External links
 
 
 

1994 births
Living people
Sportspeople from Tallinn
Estonian female tennis players